"The Thaw Session" is a jam session by English alternative rock band the Verve. It was released exclusively as a free download by the band through the NME website on 22 October 2007. The fourteen-minute song was available for only one week from the website and intended as a preview to the material the band has been working on since reforming in the summer of 2007.

The title of the download is a reference to "Deep Freeze", a hidden track in "Come On", the final song on the band's 1997 studio album Urban Hymns.

References

External links
 The Verve: The Thaw Session at NME.com

The Verve songs
2007 songs
Songs written by Nick McCabe
Songs written by Richard Ashcroft
Songs written by Simon Jones (musician)
Songs written by Peter Salisbury